Pilophorus confusus is a species of plant bug in the family Miridae. It is found in Europe, northern Asia (excluding China) and North America.

References

Further reading

 

Pilophorus (bug)
Articles created by Qbugbot
Insects described in 1856